Sochi Cup is a men's one-day cycle race which takes place in Sochi, Russia and was rated by the UCI as 1.2 and forms part of the UCI Europe Tour.

Winners

References

Cycle races in Russia
Sport in Sochi